Midnite Follies Orchestra was formed in Britain in 1978, by jazz musicians Keith Nichols and Alan Cohen, dedicated to recreating standards by some of early jazz musicians. The orchestra more or less disbanded in the 1990s. The Midnite Follies Orchestra had showcased a variety of musicians over the years, including Nick Stevenson, Digby Fairweather, Alan Elsdon, Dave Savill, Laurie Chescoe, Keith Greville, Randolph Colville, Olaf Vas, Mac White, Will Hastie, John Barnes, Gordon Blundy and Peter Strange. During the orchestra's active years, it was often featured on BBC television and radio.

Discography
Hotter Than Hades (1978; EMI)
Jungle Nights in Harlem (1981)

References

British jazz musicians
Musical groups established in 1978